But Beautiful is a 1971 studio album by Nancy Wilson, with musical accompaniment by the Hank Jones Quartet. It entered the Billboard Top 200 chart on July 17, 1971, and remained for five weeks.

Track listing 
 "Prelude to a Kiss" (Duke Ellington, Irving Gordon, Irving Mills) – 2:45
 "For Heaven's Sake" (Elise Bretton, Sherman Edwards, Donald Meyer) – 2:50
 "Happiness is a Thing Called Joe" (Harold Arlen, Yip Harburg) – 2:54
 "I'll Walk Alone" (Sammy Cahn, Jule Styne) – 3:33
 "Supper Time" (Irving Berlin) – 3:53
 "But Beautiful" (Johnny Burke, Jimmy Van Heusen) – 4:05
 "Oh! Look at Me Now" (Joe Bushkin, John DeVries) – 2:22
 "Glad to Be Unhappy" (Lorenz Hart, Richard Rodgers) – 3:17
 "In a Sentimental Mood" (Ellington, Manny Kurtz, Mills) – 2:58
 "I Thought About You" (Johnny Mercer, Van Heusen) – 2:04
 "Easy Living" (Ralph Rainger, Leo Robin) – 3:07
 "Do It Again" (Buddy DeSylva, George Gershwin) – 2:47
 "Darn That Dream" (Eddie DeLange, Van Heusen) – 2:51

Personnel 
 Nancy Wilson – vocals
 Hank Jones – piano
 Gene Bertoncini – guitar
 Ron Carter – double bass
 Grady Tate – drums

References 

1969 albums
Nancy Wilson (jazz singer) albums
Albums produced by Dave Cavanaugh
Capitol Records albums